The Greens (DG, De Groenen) is a political party in the Netherlands. It advocates for Green politics, an unconditional basic income and emphasises its anti-militarism.

History

A group of Dutch environmentalists led by Marten Bierman founded The Greens on 17 December 1983. They entered the European elections under the name "European Greens" since the name "The Greens" was controlled by Bas de Gaay Fortman. The party's foundation was supported by the Francophone Belgian green party Ecolo, while the German Greens supported the Green Progressive Accord. The party became involved in the formation of the Coordination of European Green Parties. It won 1.3% of vote in the 1984 European parliament election below the threshold of 4% for a seat.

For the 1986 national elections the party used now the name "The Greens" which was abandoned. With Marten Bierman as top-candidate it won 0.2% of the votes, below the threshold of 0.7% for a seat. The party had a federal structure consisting of provincial parties. In 1987 The Greens participated in the North Holland, South Holland and Gelderland provincial elections. They won one seat on the States of North Holland, partially because of the support of Green Amsterdam led by Roel van Duijn. On March 10, 1989 Green Amsterdam merged with The Greens.

In 1989 GroenLinks was formed by a merger of PPR, PSP, CPN and the Christian left Evangelical People's Party. The Greens rejected to join the merger because it emphasised social-economic issues too much and environmental issues too little. Independently, they participated in the 1989 elections with Roel van Duijn as their top candidate. The party won 0.35% of votes, below the threshold. The party abandoned its federal structure in 1992.

For the Dutch general election of 1994, GroenLinks proposed a candidate chosen by The Greens on place 10 on their list, but this was rejected by The Green's Congress. The party entered the election with Hein Westerouen van Meeteren as top-candidate and won 0.2% of vote. In the 1994 municipal elections the party expanded its number of seats and won seats in Leiden, Nijmegen, Zwolle and Amsterdam. In 1991 GroenLinks MEP Herman Verbeek left his party and continued as an independent. He became a member of The Greens in 1994 and led their European list in the European Parliament election. The party won 2.36% of vote, below the threshold.

In 1995 the party contested several provincial elections. It won seats in North Holland and South Holland (on a combined GroenLinks/The Greens list). The party cooperated with several provincial parties to form a common list for the indirect elections for the Senate by the States-Provincial. The first seat was taken by the "Federation of Frisian Municipal-interest Parties" and the second by Marten Bierman. Bierman was elected by preference votes. He formed a separate Independent Senate Fraction, a novelty in Dutch politics. Before no group had previously had representation in the Senate without also being present in the House of Representatives. In the 1998 elections the party participated with Jaap Dirkmaat as top-candidate and won 0.2% of the votes. The party did keep its seats in municipal councils and expanded to Haarlem, Zeist, Arnhem, Groningen and Haren.

The Greens have not participated in the Dutch general elections since 1998. The party received 0.19% of the vote in the European elections of 2009 and 0.23% of the vote in the European elections of 2014.

By 2017 the party was split into two conflicting groups both claiming legitimacy with the total party membership being 33. One faction held a congress with 10 attendees which elected Otto ter Haar party leader.

House of Representatives 
The Greens have participated in five elections, failing to pass the threshold of 0,67 percent on each occasion.

House of Representatives

European Parliament 
The Greens is a founding party of the European Green Party.
The Greens participated since 1984 five times in the European elections.

States-Provincial 
The Greens have been elected in the States of North Holland between 1987 and 2003, South Holland (1995–1999) and Gelderland (1995–2003).

Municipal councils 
The Greens have been elected in the municipal councils of Amsterdam, Leiden, Zwolle, Nijmegen, Haarlem and Haren.

Water boards 
In March 2015 The Greens were elected to the water board of Amstel, Gooi en Vecht with 23,604 votes (5.9%).

See also

Green party
List of environmental organizations

References

External links
Official web site, in Dutch

Green political parties in the Netherlands
Political parties in the Netherlands
Political parties established in 1983
Political parties supporting universal basic income
European Green Party
Global Greens member parties
1983 establishments in the Netherlands